Tasos Pappas (born 1 September 1984) is a Greek footballer who last played for Aiolikos in the Gamma Ethniki.

References

1984 births
Living people
Greek footballers
Association football defenders
Aiolikos F.C. players
A.O. Kerkyra players
Sportspeople from Corfu